Aralia malabarica is a species of plant in the family Araliaceae. It is  endemic to India.

References

Endemic flora of India (region)
malabarica
Taxonomy articles created by Polbot
Plants described in 1871